Polo is a ball game played on horseback, a traditional field sport and one of the world's oldest known team sports. The game is played by two opposing teams with the objective of scoring using a long-handled wooden mallet to hit a small hard ball through the opposing team's goal. Each team has four mounted riders, and the game usually lasts one to two hours, divided into periods called chukkas or "chukkers".

Polo has been called "the sport of kings", and has become a spectator sport for equestrians and high society, often supported by sponsorship. In Persia, where the sport evolved and developed, it was at first a training game for cavalry units, usually the royal guard or other elite troops. A notable example is Saladin, who was known for being a skilled polo player which contributed to his cavalry training. It is now popular around the world, with well over 100 member countries in the Federation of International Polo, played professionally in 16 countries, and was an Olympic sport from 1900 to 1936.

Arena polo is an indoor or semi-outdoor variant with similar rules, and is played with three riders per team. The playing field is smaller, enclosed and usually of compacted sand or fine aggregate, and often indoors. Arena polo has more maneuvering due to space limitations, and uses an air-inflated ball slightly larger than the hard solid ball used in field polo. Standard mallets are used, though slightly larger-head arena mallets are an option.

History

Origins and etymology 

The game's English name derives from the Balti language, from its word for 'ball', . It is cognate with the Standard Tibetan , also meaning 'ball'.

Although the exact origins of the game are not certain, many scholars suggest it most likely began as a simple game played by Iranic and Turkic equestrian nomads in Central Asia. An archaic variation of polo, regionally referred to as buzkashi or kokpar, is still played in parts of Central Asia. It was developed and formalised in Ancient Iran (Persia) as "chovgan", becoming a national sport played extensively by the nobility. Women played as well as men. During the period of the Parthian Empire (247 BC to 224 AD), the sport had great patronage under the kings and noblemen. According to The Oxford Dictionary of Late Antiquity,  the Persian ball game was an important pastime in the court of the Sasanian Empire (224–651). It was also part of the royal education for the Sasanian ruling class. Emperor Shapur II learnt to play polo at age seven in 316 AD.

Middle Ages and Early Modern era 

Valuable for training cavalry, the game was played from Constantinople, where Emperor Theodosius II constructed a polo ground early in the 5th century, to Japan by the Middle Ages. The game also spread south to Arabia and to India and Tibet.

Abbasid Baghdad had a large polo ground outside its walls, and one of the city's early 13th century gates, the Bab al Halba, was named after these nearby polo grounds. The game continued to be supported by Mongol rulers of Persia in the 13th century, as well as under the Safavid dynasty. In the 17th century, Naqsh-i Jahan Square in Isfahan was built as a polo field by King Abbas I. The game was also learnt by the neighbouring Byzantine Empire at an early date. A  (stadium for playing , the Byzantine name for polo) was built by Emperor Theodosius II inside the Great Palace of Constantinople. Emperor Basil I excelled at it; Emperor Alexander died from exhaustion while playing and Emperor  died from a fatal injury during a game.

After the Muslim conquests to the Ayyubid and Mameluke dynasties of Egypt and the Levant, their elites favoured it above all other sports. Notable sultans such as Saladin and Baybars were known to play it and encourage it in their courts. Polo sticks were featured as one of the suits on the Mamluk precursor to modern-day playing cards. Europeans transformed the polo stick suit into the "clubs" of the "Latin" decks, as polo was little known to them at that time.

The game spread to South Asia where it has had a strong presence in the northwestern areas of present-day Pakistan (including Gilgit, Chitral, Hunza and Baltistan) since at least the 15th–16th century.  Qutubuddin Aibak, originally a Turkic slave who later founded the Mamluk dynasty (1206–1290) Delhi Sultanate, was accidentally killed during a game of polo when his horse fell and he was impaled on the pommel of his saddle. 

Polo likely travelled via the Silk Road to China where it was popular in the Tang dynasty capital of Chang'an, and also played by women, who wore male dress to do so; many Tang dynasty tomb figures of female players survive. According to The Oxford Dictionary of Late Antiquity, the popularity of polo in Tang China was "bolstered, no doubt, by the presence of the Sasanian court in exile". A "polo-obsessed" noblewoman was buried with her donkeys on 6 October 878 in Xi’an, China.

Modern game

India and Britain 

A European polo club was established in the town of Silchar in Assam, India, in 1859, the English tea planters having learnt it from Manipuri incomers.

This was one of three forms of hockey in Manipur, the other ones being field hockey (called ) and wrestling-hockey (called ). These may indicate an origin earlier than the historical records of Manipur. Further regular playing of this game commenced in 1605, during the reign of King Khagemba under newly framed rules of the game. 

In Manipur, polo is traditionally played with seven players to a side. There are no goal posts, and a player scores simply by hitting the ball out of either end of the field. Players strike the ball with the long side of the mallet head, not the end. Players are not permitted to carry the ball, although blocking the ball with any part of the body except the open hand is permitted. The sticks are made of cane, and the balls are made from the roots of bamboo. Players protected their legs by attaching leather shields to their saddles and girths.

In Manipur, the game was played even by commoners who owned a pony. The kings of Manipur had a royal polo ground within the ramparts of their Kangla Fort. Weekly games called  were also played in a polo ground outside the current palace.

The oldest polo ground in the world is the Imphal Polo Ground in Manipur State. Lieutenant (later Major General) Joseph Ford Sherer, the father of modern polo, visited the state and played on this polo ground in the 1850s. Lord Curzon, the Viceroy of India visited the state in 1901 and measured the polo ground as "225 yards long and 110 yards wide".

The Cachar Club, established in 1859, is located on Club Road in the heart of Silchar city in Assam. In 1862, the oldest polo club still in existence, Calcutta Polo Club, was established by two British soldiers, Sherer and Captain Robert Stewart. Later they spread the game to their peers in England. Polo was first played in England by the 10th Hussars in 1869. The British are credited with spreading polo worldwide in the late 19th century and the early 20th century at the height of its empire. Military officers imported the game to Britain in the 1860s. The establishment of polo clubs throughout England and western Europe followed after the formal codification of rules. The 10th Hussars at Aldershot, Hants, introduced polo to England in 1834. The game's governing body in the United Kingdom is the Hurlingham Polo Association, which drew up the first set of formal British rules in 1874, many of which are still in existence.

This version of polo played in the 19th century was different from the faster form that was played in Manipur. The game was slow and methodical, with little passing between players and few set plays that required specific movements by participants without the ball. Neither players nor horses were trained to play a fast, non-stop game. This form of polo lacked the aggressive methods and required fewer equestrian skills. From the 1800s to the 1910s, a host of teams representing Indian principalities dominated the international polo scene.

The World Champions Polo League was launched in Jaipur in 2016. It is a new version of polo, similar to the Twenty20 format of cricket. The pitch was made smaller and accommodated a large audience. The first event of the World Champions Polo League took place in Bhavnagar, Gujarat, with six teams and room for 10,000 spectators. The rules were changed and the duration of matches made shorter.

Argentina 

British and Irish immigrants in the Argentine pampas started practising polo during their free time. Among them, David Shennan is credited with having organised the first formal polo game of the country in 1875, at Estancia El Negrete, located in Buenos Aires Province.

The sport spread quickly among the skillful gauchos, and several clubs opened in the following years in the towns of Venado Tuerto, Cañada de Gómez, Quilmes, Flores and later (1888) Hurlingham. In 1892 The River Plate Polo Association was founded and constituted the basis for the current Asociación Argentina de Polo. In the Olympic Games held in Paris in 1924 a team composed of Juan Miles, Enrique Padilla, Juan Nelson, Arturo Kenny, G. Brooke Naylor and A. Peña achieved the first gold medal in the nation's Olympic history. The title was defended at the 1936 Berlin Games with players Manuel Andrada, Andrés Gazzotti, Roberto Cavanagh, Luis Duggan, Juan Nelson, Diego Cavanagh, and Enrique Alberdi.

The game spread across the country, and Argentina is credited globally as the capital of polo; Argentina is noted world wide for having the largest contingent of 10 handicap players.

Five teams were able to gather four 10 handicap players each, to make 40 handicap teams: Coronel Suárez, 1975, 1977–1979 (Alberto Heguy, Juan Carlos Harriott, Alfredo Harriot and Horacio Heguy); La Espadaña, 1989–1990 (Carlos Gracida, Gonzalo Pieres, Alfonso Pieres y Ernesto Trotz Jr.); Indios Chapaleufú, 1992–1993 (Bautista Heguy, Gonzalo Heguy, Horacio Heguy Jr. and Marcos Heguy); La Dolfina, 2009–2010 (Adolfo Cambiaso Jr., Lucas Monteverde, Mariano Aguerre y Bartolomé Castagnola); Ellerstina, 2009 (Facundo Pieres, Gonzalo Pieres Jr., Pablo Mac Donough and Juan Martín Nero).

The three major polo tournaments in Argentina, known as "Triple Corona" ("Triple Crown"), are Hurlingham Polo Open, Tortugas Polo Open and Palermo Polo Open. Polo season usually lasts from October to December.

Polo has found popularity throughout the rest of the Americas, including Brazil, Chile, Mexico, and the United States of America.

United States 

James Gordon Bennett Jr. on 16 May 1876 organised what was billed as the first polo match in the United States at Dickel's Riding Academy at 39th Street and Fifth Avenue in New York City. The historical record states that James Gordon Bennett established the Westchester Polo Club on 6 May 1876, and on 13 May 1876, the Jerome Park Racetrack in Westchester County (now Bronx County) was the site of the "first" American outdoor polo match.

H. L. Herbert, James Gordon Bennett and August Belmont Jr. financed the original New York Polo Grounds. Herbert stated in a 1913 article that they formed the Westchester Club after the "first" outdoor game was played on 13 May 1876. This contradicts the historical record of the club being established before the Jerome Park game.

There is ample evidence that the first to play polo in America were actually the English Texans. The Galveston News reported on 2 May 1876 that Denison, Texas had a polo club which was before James Gordon Bennett established his Westchester Club or attempted to play the "first" game. The Denison team sent a letter to James Gordon Bennett challenging him to a match. The challenge was published 2 June 1876, in The Galveston Daily News. By the time the article came out on 2 June, the Denison Club had already received a letter from Bennett indicating the challenge was offered before the "first" games in New York.

There is an urban legend that the first game of polo in America was played in Boerne, Texas, at retired British officer Captain Glynn Turquand's famous Balcones Ranch. The Boerne, Texas, legend also has plenty of evidence pointing to the fact that polo was played in Boerne before James Gordon Bennett Jr. ever picked up a polo mallet.

During the early part of the 20th century, under the leadership of Harry Payne Whitney, polo changed to become a high-speed sport in the United States, differing from the game in England, where it involved short passes to move the ball towards the opposition's goal. Whitney and his teammates used the fast break, sending long passes downfield to riders who had broken away from the pack at a full gallop. In 1909 a United States team defeated an English team with ease. 

In the late 1950s, champion polo player and Director of the Long Island Polo Association, Walter Scanlon, introduced the "short form", or "European" style, four period match, to the game of polo.

Rules 

All tournaments and levels of play and players are organized within and between polo clubs, including membership, rules, safety, fields and arenas.

The rules of polo are written to include the safety of both players and horses. Games are monitored by umpires. A whistle is blown when an infraction occurs, and penalties are awarded. Strategic plays in polo are based on the "line of the ball", an imaginary line that extends through the ball in the line of travel. This line traces the ball's path and extends past the ball along that trajectory. The line of the ball defines rules for players to approach the ball safely. The "line of the ball" changes each time the ball changes direction. The player who hits the ball generally has the right of way, and other players cannot cross the line of the ball in front of that player. As players approach the ball, they ride on either side of the line of the ball giving each access to the ball. A player can cross the line of the ball when it does not create a dangerous situation. Most infractions and penalties are related to players improperly crossing the line of the ball or the right of way. When a player has the line of the ball on their right, they have the right of way. A "ride-off" is when a player moves another player off the line of the ball by making shoulder-to-shoulder contact with the other players' horses.

The defending player has a variety of opportunities for their team to gain possession of the ball. They can push the opponent off the line or steal the ball from the opponent. Another common defensive play is called "hooking." While a player is taking a swing at the ball, their opponent can block the swing by using their mallet to hook the mallet of the player swinging at the ball. A player may hook only if they are on the side where the swing is being made or directly behind an opponent. A player may not purposely touch another player, another player's tack, or a pony with their mallet. Unsafe hooking is a foul that will result in a penalty shot being awarded. For example, it is a foul for a player to reach over an opponent's mount in an attempt to hook.

The other basic defensive play is called the bump or ride-off. It's similar to a body check in hockey. In a ride-off, a player rides their pony alongside an opponent's mount to move an opponent away from the ball or to take them out of a play. It must be executed properly so that it does not endanger the horses or the players. The angle of contact must be safe and can not knock the horses off balance, or harm the horses in any way. Two players following the line of the ball and riding one another off have the right of way over a single man coming from any direction.

Like in hockey or basketball, fouls are potentially dangerous plays that infringe on the rules of the game. To the novice spectator, fouls may be difficult to discern. There are degrees of dangerous and unfair play and penalty shots are awarded depending based on the severity of the foul and where the foul was committed on the polo field. White lines on the polo field indicate where the mid-field, sixty, forty and thirty yard penalties are taken.

The official set of rules and rules interpretations are reviewed and published annually by each country's polo association. Most of the smaller associations follow the rules of the Hurlingham Polo Association, the national governing body of the sport of polo in the United Kingdom, and the United States Polo Association.

Outdoor polo 
Outdoor or field polo lasts about one and a half to two hours and consists of four to eight seven-minute chukkas, between or during which players change mounts. At the end of each seven-minute chukka, play continues for an additional 30 seconds or until a stoppage in play, whichever comes first. There is a four-minute interval between chukkas and a ten-minute halftime. Play is continuous and is only stopped for rule infractions (fouls), broken tack (equipment) or injury to horse or player. The object is to score goals by hitting the ball between the goal posts, no matter how high in the air. If the ball goes wide of the goal, the defending team is allowed a free 'knock-in' from the place where the ball crossed the goal line, thus getting ball back into play.

Indoor or arena polo 
Arena polo has rules similar to the field version, and is less strenuous for the player. There are many arena clubs in the United States, and most major polo clubs, including the Santa Barbara Polo & Racquet Club, have active arena programmes. The major differences between the outdoor and indoor games are: speed (outdoor being faster), physicality/roughness (indoor/arena is more physical), ball size (indoor is larger), goal size (because the arena is smaller the goal is smaller), and some penalties. In the United States and Canada, collegiate polo is arena polo; in the UK, collegiate polo is both.

Some of the most important arena polo tournaments held are:
 The U.S. Arena Polo Championship, a 12-18 goal tournament, is one of the highest levels of fast version of polo competition currently played in the United States. Its history dates back to 1926, where the first tournament was held and won by the Yale University team of Reddington Barret, Winston Guest and William Mui.
 The Arena Polo Grand Prix held in Argentina, promoted by La Carona Polo Club along with the Argentine Polo Association, was organized for the first time in June 2019, and was the start for the Arena Polo in Argentina.
 The Arena Polo European Championship. The first tournament of this championship was held in 2015. Alongside the Equestrian Federation of Azerbaijan Republic (ARAF) the tournament was organized by the team of World Polo

Polo ponies 

The mounts used are called 'polo ponies', although the term pony is purely traditional and the mount is actually a full-sized horse. The polo pony is selected carefully for quick bursts of speed, stamina, agility and manoeuvrability. Temperament is critical; the horse must remain responsive under pressure and not become excited or difficult to control. Many are Thoroughbreds or Thoroughbred crosses. They are trained to be handled with one hand on the reins, and to respond to the rider's leg and weight cues for moving forward, turning and stopping. A well trained horse will carry its rider smoothly and swiftly to the ball and can account for 60 to 75 percent of the player's skill and net worth to their team.

Polo pony training generally begins at age three and lasts from about six months to two years. Most horses reach full physical maturity at about age five, and ponies are at their peak of athleticism and training at around age six or seven. However, without any accidents, polo ponies may have the ability to play until they are 18 to 20 years of age.

Each player must have more than one horse, to allow for tired mounts to be replaced by fresh ones between or even during chukkas. A player's "string" of polo ponies may number two or three in Low Goal matches (with ponies being rested for at least a chukka before reuse), four or more for Medium Goal matches (at least one per chukka), and even more for the highest levels of competition.

Players 

Each team consists of four mounted players, which can be mixed teams of both men and women.

Each position assigned to a player has certain responsibilities:
 Number One is the most offence-oriented position on the field. The Number One position, which generally covers the opposing team's Number Four, is usually the rookie of the team.
 Number Two has an important role in offence, either running through and scoring themselves, or passing to the Number One and getting in behind them. Defensively, they will cover the opposing team's Number Three, generally the other team's best player. Given the difficulty of this position, it is not uncommon for the best player on the team to play Number Two so long as another strong player is available to play Three.
 Number Three is the tactical leader and must be a long powerful hitter to feed balls to Number Two and Number One as well as maintaining a solid defense. The best player on the team is usually the Number Three player, usually wielding the highest handicap.
 Number Four is the primary defense player. They can move anywhere on the field, but they usually try to prevent scoring. The emphasis on defense by the Number Four allows the Number Three to attempt more offensive plays, since they know that they will be covered if they lose the ball.

Polo must be played right-handed to prevent head-on collisions.

Equipment 

The rules for equipment vary in details between the hosting authorities, but are always for the safety of the players and mounts.

Mandatory equipment includes a protective helmet with chinstrap worn at all times by all players and mounted grooms. They have a rigid exterior and interior protective padding and must be to a locally accepted safety standard, PAS015 (UK), NOCSAE (USA). A faceguard is commonly integral with the helmet.

Polo boots and kneeguards are mandatory in the UK during official play, and boots are recommended for all play everywhere. The UK also recommends goggles, elbow pads and gum shields. A shirt or jersey is required that distinguishes the player's team, and is not black and white stripes like an umpire shirt.

White polo pants or trousers are worn during official play. Polo gloves are commonly worn to protect from working the reins and mallet.

Not permitted is any equipment that may harm horses, such as certain spurs or whips.

Ball 
The modern outdoor polo ball is made of a high-impact plastic. Historically they have been made of bamboo, leather covered cork, hard rubber, and for many years willow root. Originally the British used a white painted leather covered cricket ball.

Plastic balls were introduced in the 1970s. They are less prone to breakage and much cheaper.

This provides for a hard and lively ball.

Mallet 
The polo mallet consists of a cane shaft with a rubber-wrapped grip, a webbed thong, called a sling, for wrapping around the thumb, and a wooden cigar-shaped head. The shaft is made of manau-cane (not bamboo, which is hollow) although a small number of mallets today are made from composite materials. Composite materials are usually not preferred by top players because the shaft of composite mallets can't absorb vibrations as well as traditional cane mallets. The mallet head is generally made from a hardwood called tipa, approximately 9" inches long. The weight of the mallet head is of important consideration for the more seasoned players. Female players often use lighter mallets than male players. For some polo players, the length of the mallet depends on the size of the horse: the taller the horse, the longer the mallet. However, some players prefer to use a single length of mallet regardless of the height of the horse. Either way, playing horses of differing heights requires some adjustment by the rider. The term mallet is used exclusively in US English; British English prefers the term polo stick. The ball is struck with the broad sides of the mallet head rather than its round and flat tips.

Saddle 

Polo saddles are English-style, close contact, similar to jumping saddles; although most polo saddles lack a flap under the billets. Some players will not use a saddle blanket. The saddle has a flat seat and no knee support; the rider adopting a forward-leaning seat and closed knees dissimilar to a classical dressage seat. A breastplate is added, usually attached to the front billet. A standing martingale must be used: so, a breastplate is a necessity for safety. The tie-down is usually supported by a neck strap. Many saddles also have an overgirth. The stirrup irons are heavier than most, and the stirrup leathers are wider and thicker, for added safety when the player stands in the stirrups. The legs of the pony are wrapped with polo wraps from below the knee to the fetlock to minimize pain. Jumping (open front) or gallop boots are sometimes used along with the polo wraps for added protection. Often, these wraps match the team colours. The pony's mane is most often roached (hogged), and its tail is docked or braided so that it will not snag the rider's mallet.

Polo is ridden with double reins for greater accuracy of signals. The bit is frequently a gag bit or Pelham bit. In both cases, the gag or shank rein will be the bottom rein in the rider's hands, while the snaffle rein will be the top rein. If a gag bit is used, there will be a drop noseband in addition to the cavesson, supporting the tie-down. One of the rein sets may alternately be draw reins.

The field 

The playing field is carefully maintained with closely mowed turf providing a safe, fast playing surface. Goals are posts which are set eight yards apart, centred at each end of the field. The surface of a polo field requires careful and constant grounds maintenance to keep the surface in good playing condition. During half-time of a match, spectators are invited to go onto the field to participate in a polo tradition called "divot stamping", which was developed not only to help replace the mounds of earth (divots) that are torn up by the horses' hooves, but also to afford spectators the opportunity to walk about and socialise.

Contemporary sport 

Polo is played professionally in many countries, notably Argentina, Australia, Brazil, Canada, Chile, Dominican Republic, France, Germany, Iran, India, New Zealand, Mexico, Pakistan, Jamaica, Spain, South Africa, Switzerland, the United Kingdom, and the United States, and is now an active sport in 77 countries. Although its tenure as an Olympic sport was limited to 1900–1939, in 1998 the International Olympic Committee recognised it as a sport with a bona fide international governing body, the Federation of International Polo. The World Polo Championship is held every three years by the Federation.

Polo is unique among team sports in that amateur players, often the team patrons, routinely hire and play alongside the sport's top professionals.

Some of the most important tournaments, at club level, are Abierto de Tortugas, Abierto de Hurlingham and Abierto Argentino de Polo, all of them in Argentina (la Triple Corona).

East and Southeast Asia 

Polo has been played in Malaysia and Singapore, both of which are former British colonies, since being introduced to Malaya during the late 19th century. Royal Johor Polo Club was formed in 1884 and Singapore Polo Club was formed in 1886. The oldest polo club in the modern country of Malaysia is Selangor Polo Club, founded in 1902. It was largely played by royalty and the political and business elite.

Polo was played at the 2007 Southeast Asian Games, 2017 Southeast Asian Games and 2019 Southeast Asian Games. Nations that competed in the tournament were Indonesia, Singapore, Malaysia, Thailand and Philippines (2007), Brunei, Malaysia, Singapore and Thailand (2017) and Indonesia, Brunei, Philippines and Malaysia (2019). The 2007 tournament's gold medal was won by the Malaysian team, followed by Singapore with silver and Thailand with bronze while the 2017 tournament's gold medal was won by Malaysia, followed by Thailand with silver and Brunei with bronze. The 2019 tournament's gold medal was won by Malaysia, followed by the Philippines with silver, and Brunei receiving bronze.

The recent resurgence in south-east Asia has resulted in its popularity in cities such as Pattaya, Kuala Lumpur and Jakarta. In Pattaya alone, there are three active polo clubs: Polo Escape, Siam Polo Park and the Thai Polo and Equestrian Club. Indonesia has a polo club (Nusantara Polo Club). More recently, Janek Gazecki and Australian professional Jack "Ruki" Baillieu have organised polo matches in parks "around metropolitan Australia, backed by wealthy sponsors."

A Chinese Equestrian Association has been formed with two new clubs in China itself: the Beijing Sunny Time Polo Club, founded by Xia Yang in 2004 and the Nine Dragons Hill Polo Club in Shanghai, founded in 2005.

West Asia 

Polo is not widely spread in West Asia, but still counts five active clubs in Iran, four active polo clubs in the UAE, one club in Bahrain and The Royal Jordanian Polo Club in Amman, Jordan.

Polo in Iran is governed by the Polo Federation of Iran. There are five polo clubs in Iran: Ghasr-e Firoozeh, Nowroozabad, Army Ground Forces, Kanoon-e Chogan and Nesf-e Jahan. Iran possesses some of the best grass polo fields in the region. The country currently has over 100 registered players of which approximately 15% are women. Historically, Kurdish and Persian Arabian horses were the most widely used for polo. This was probably also the case in ancient times. Today Thoroughbreds are being increasingly used alongside the Kurdish and Persian Arabian horses. Some players have also been experimenting with Anglo-Arabians. Iranians still refer to the game of polo by its original Persian name of "Chogan", which means mallet. Iranians still maintain some of the ancient rituals of the game in official polo matches.

India 

The governing body of polo in India is the Indian Polo Association.

Ireland 
Polo first began its Irish history in 1870 with the first official game played on Gormanstown Strand, Co. Meath. Three years later the All Ireland Polo Club was founded by Mr. Horace Rochford in the Phoenix Park. Since then the sport has continued to grow with a further seven clubs opening around the country. The sport has also been made more accessible by these clubs by the creation of more affordable training programmes, such as the beginner to pro programme at Polo Wicklow.

Pakistan 
The annual Shandur Polo Festival at Shandur Top in Chitral District is an international event attended by enthusiasts from all over the world. The governing body of polo in Pakistan is the Pakistan Polo Association. There are more than twenty-one polo clubs in Pakistan and over forty polo championships held all over the country every year. Pakistan has qualified for the preliminary rounds of the World Polo Championship three times. Pakistan's Hissam Ali Haider is the highest capped played in the Asian circuit. He has played for Cartier in the St. Moritz Snow Polo World Cup and the Commonwealth team in the Royal Salute Coronation Cup, both of which were won by his team.

United Kingdom 
The governing body in the United Kingdom is the Hurlingham Polo Association, dating from 1875, which amalgamated with the County Polo Association in 1949. The UK Armed Forces Polo Association oversees the sport in the three armed services.

United States 
The United States Polo Association (USPA) is the governing body for polo in the U.S. The U.S. is the only country that has separate women's polo, run by the United States Women's Polo Federation.

Variants and related sports 

These variants are considered sports separate from standard polo because of the differences in the composition of teams, equipment, rules, game facilities, and so on.

Variant forms of arena polo include beach polo, played in many countries between teams of three riders on a sand surface, and cowboy polo, played almost exclusively in the western United States by teams of five riders on a dirt surface.

Another modern variant is snow polo, which is played on compacted snow on flat ground or a frozen lake. The format of snow polo varies depending on the space available. Each team generally consists of three players and a bright coloured light plastic ball is preferred. Snow polo is not the same sport as ice polo, which was popular in the US in the late 1890s. That sport resembled ice hockey and bandy but died out entirely in favour of the Canadian ice hockey rules.

Water polo shares a name with polo, but more closely resembles handball. , the polo variety discussed above, is arguably a version of polo though it can also be seen as the precursor of modern outdoor polo.

Variants that are related but clearly diverge from the polo format include: 
 Cowboy polo uses rules similar to regular polo, but riders compete with western saddles, usually in a smaller arena, using an inflatable rubber medicine ball.
 Horseball is a game played on horseback where a ball is handled and points are scored by shooting it through a high net. The sport is a combination of polo, rugby, and basketball.
 Pato was played in Argentina for centuries, but is very different from modern polo. No mallets are used, and it is not played on grass.
 Polocrosse is a combination of polo and lacrosse and is also played on horseback. It was developed in Australia in the late 1930s.

Played on vehicles or other animals 
Polo is not played exclusively on horseback. Such polo variants are mostly played for recreational or tourism purposes.

Non-equine variations include:

On other animals
 Camel polo is played in Mongolia
 Elephant polo is played in South Asia.
 Yak polo is played in Mongolia and western China.

On vehicles
 Auto polo was a motorsport invented in the United States in the early 1900s. Its rules and equipment were similar to polo but automobiles were used instead of horses.
 Canoe polo is played around the world in kayaks and governed by the International Canoe Federation.
 Cycle polo is a similar game played on bicycles instead of horses. A variant of cycle polo is also played on penny-farthings.
 Golfcart polo
 Motoball (motorcycle polo) was invented in the United States.
 Segway polo originated in the United States.

A lighthearted variant, hobby horse polo , was devised in 1998 in south western Germany. The  Polo-Club in Mannheim was founded in 2002 to organise matches and promote the game. Since then, the variant has gained further interest in other German cities. It is played on hobby horses, the toy, instead of polo ponies. While following standard polo rules in part, it has some more unusual rules: Goals, for example, are the height and width of bar stools; and any departure from accepted gameplay standards will attract "penalty sherries" to be consumed by the offending player.

See also 
 Dakyu
 Commercial animal cloning
 List of polo players
 Polo handicap
 PIPA Polo Instructors and Players Association
 U.S. Open Polo Championship

Notes

References

Further reading 
 
 

 
Former Summer Olympic sports
Mixed-sex sports